Björn Fallenius is a Swedish bridge player, for many years a resident of New York City. He and his late wife Kathy Fallenius operated the Cavendish Bridge Club.

In world championship  competition, Fallenius represented Sweden and won bronze medals in the 1987 and 1991 Bermuda Bowls and the 1988 World Team Olympiad. He also won bronze medals in the 1986 and 1998 Rosenblum Cups (on all-Swedish teams, although that quadrennial event is not nationally representative).

In s competition, Fallenius and Peter Fredin won the European Bridge League Open Pairs in 2009 and finished second in the 2010 World Open Pairs (silver medal). Fredin and Kathy Fallenius have played together in the World Mixed Pairs.

Bridge accomplishments

Awards

 Fishbein Trophy (1) 2006

Wins

 North American Bridge Championships (11)
 von Zedtwitz Life Master Pairs (1) 2006 
 Wernher Open Pairs (1) 1998 
 Blue Ribbon Pairs (1) 2009 
 Nail Life Master Open Pairs (1) 2007 
 Jacoby Open Swiss Teams (1) 1996 
 Vanderbilt (1) 2007 
 Mitchell Board-a-Match Teams (1) 2005 
 Reisinger (2) 1991, 2001 
 Roth Open Swiss Teams (1) 2006 
 Spingold (1) 2003

Runners-up

 North American Bridge Championships
 Jacoby Open Swiss Teams (1) 2002 
 Roth Open Swiss Teams (1) 2011 
 Vanderbilt (2) 1993, 2006 
 Mitchell Board-a-Match Teams (2) 2002, 2004 
 Chicago Mixed Board-a-Match (1) 1992 
 Reisinger (1) 2003

References

External links
 
 
 

Swedish contract bridge players
Swedish emigrants to the United States
Living people
Year of birth missing (living people)
Place of birth missing (living people)